Early in the Morning is the first full-length album by Irish singer-songwriter James Vincent McMorrow.  The album has drawn comparisons to Bon Iver for both its sound and the recording technique. The album was first released in Ireland on 26 February 2010.

Track listing

Chart performance

Release history

References

2010 debut albums
James Vincent McMorrow albums
European Border Breakers Award-winning albums